Lesley Jean Murdoch  (born 18 March 1956) is a New Zealand former cricketer and field hockey player. Between 1979 and 1990 she appeared in 6 Test matches and 25 One Day Internationals for New Zealand as a batter. Murdoch also captained New Zealand in three Tests, drawing two and losing one, and fifteen One Day Internationals, winning eight and losing six, with one no result. She played domestic cricket for Canterbury. In hockey, she was a member of the New Zealand team that finished sixth at the 1984 Los Angeles Olympics.

In the 1987 New Year Honours, Murdoch was made a Member of the Order of the British Empire, for services to cricket and hockey. In the 2016 Queen's Birthday Honours, she was appointed an Officer of the New Zealand Order of Merit for services to sport.

Murdoch is currently a commentator for Sky Network Television calling netball, hockey and cricket. She also is a sideline reporter for Radio Sport during rugby matches at AMI Stadium and hosts a Saturday morning sports show on Christchurch's Newstalk ZB.

She is also a commentator for the OBS.

References

External links
 

1956 births
Living people
New Zealand women cricketers
New Zealand women's One Day International captains
New Zealand women's Test captains
New Zealand women Test cricketers
New Zealand women One Day International cricketers
New Zealand women cricket captains
Canterbury Magicians cricketers
New Zealand female field hockey players
Olympic field hockey players of New Zealand
Field hockey players at the 1984 Summer Olympics
New Zealand Members of the Order of the British Empire
Field hockey players from Christchurch
Officers of the New Zealand Order of Merit
Cricketers from Christchurch